Sekhemre Khutawy Sobekhotep (appears in most sources as Amenemhat Sobekhotep; now believed to be Sobekhotep I; known as Sobekhotep II in older studies) was an Egyptian pharaoh of the 13th Dynasty during the Second Intermediate Period, who reigned for at least three years c. 1800 BC.

His chronological position is much debated, Sekhemre Khutawy Sobekhotep being either the founder of the dynasty, in which case he is called Sobekhotep I, or its twentieth ruler, in which case he is called Sobekhotep II. In his 1997 study of the Second Intermediate Period, the Egyptologist Kim Ryholt makes a strong case for Sekhemre Khutawy Sobekhotep as the founder of the dynasty, a hypothesis that is now dominant in Egyptology.

Attestations

Sekhemre Khutawy Sobekhotep is attested by contemporary sources. First, he is mentioned on the Kahun Papyrus IV, now in the Petrie Museum (UC32166). (Ryholt, p. 315) This Kahun Papyrus is "a census of the household of a lector-priest that is dated to the first regnal year" of the king and also records the birth of a son of the lector-priest during a 40th regnal year, "which can only refer to Amenemhat III." This establishes that Sekhemre Khutawy Sobekhotep reigned close in time to Amenemhat III.

Architecture
A number of architectural elements bearing Sobekhotep's titulary are known: a fragment of a Hebsed chapel from Medamud, three lintels from Deir el-Bahri and Medamud, an architrave from Luxor and a doorjamb from Medamud that is now in the Louvre.

Nile Level Records
Three Nile level records from Semna and Kumna in Nubia are also attributable to Sekhemre Khutawy Sobekhotep, the latest of which is dated to year 4, showing that he reigned for at least three complete years.

Small finds
Smaller artifacts mentioning Sekhemre Khutawy Sobekhotep comprise a cylinder seal from Gebelein, an adze-blade, a statuette from Kerma and a faience bead, now in the Petrie Museum (UC 13202).

Alleged tomb

His tomb was believed to have been discovered in Abydos in 2013, but its attribution is now questioned. During a 2013 excavation in Abydos, a team of archaeologists led by Josef W. Wegner of the University of Pennsylvania discovered the tomb of a king with the name Sobekhotep. While Sobekhotep I was named as owner of the tomb on several press reports since January 2014, further investigations made it more likely that the tomb belongs to king Sobekhotep IV instead.

Chronological position

There is some dispute in Egyptology over the position of this king in the 13th Dynasty. The throne name Sekhemre Khutawyre appears in the Turin King List as the 19th king of the 13th Dynasty. However, the Nile level records and his appearance on a papyrus found at Lahun indicate that he might date to the early 13th Dynasty. In both monument types only kings of the late 12th and early 13th Dynasty are mentioned.

In the Turin King List, Khutawyre appears as the first 13th Dynasty king; Egyptologist Kim Ryholt maintains that it is possible that the writer of the list confused Sekhemre Khutawy with Khutawyre, the nomen of Wegaf. Furthermore, the identification of any mention of Sekhemre Khutawy is difficult, as at least three kings are known to have had this name: Sekhemre Khutawy Sobekhotep, Sekhemre Khutawy Pantjeny and Sekhemre Khutawy Khabaw.

Based on his name Amenemhat Sobekhotep, it has been suggested that Sobekhotep was a son of the penultimate pharaoh of the 12th Dynasty, king Amenemhat IV. Amenemhat Sobekhotep can be read as Amenemhat's son Sobekhotep. Therefore, Sobekhotep may have been a brother of Sekhemkare Sonbef, the second ruler of the 13th Dynasty. Other Egyptologists read Amenemhat Sobekhotep as a double name, these being common in the Twelfth and Thirteenth Dynasty.

References

Further reading

 K. S. B. Ryholt, The Political Situation in Egypt during the Second Intermediate Period, c.1800–1550 BC, (Carsten Niebuhr Institute Publications, vol. 20. Copenhagen: Museum Tusculanum Press, 1997), 336, File 13/1.

19th-century BC Pharaohs
18th-century BC Pharaohs
Pharaohs of the Thirteenth Dynasty of Egypt
2nd-millennium BC births
2nd-millennium BC deaths